Association Sportive des Employés et Commerçants de Koudougou is a Burkinabé football club based in Koudougou. They play their home games at the Stade Balibiè.

Football clubs in Burkina Faso